Stacey Naris  (born 24 February 1991), is a Namibian women's international footballer who plays as a defender. She is a member of the Namibia women's national football team. She was part of the team at the 2014 African Women's Championship. On club level she played for TuS Lipperode in Germany.

Stacey was appointed as a new Board member of Fifpro's Africa Division to represent the entire Africa

References

1991 births
Living people
Namibian women's footballers
Namibia women's international footballers
Place of birth missing (living people)
Women's association football defenders
Expatriate women's footballers in Germany
Namibian expatriate women's footballers